Mark Berson (born March 16, 1953) is an American retired soccer coach. He spent 43 seasons as head men's soccer coach at the University of South Carolina. He started his coaching career at The Citadel in 1976.

Collegiate career
Berson graduated from Summit High School in Summit, New Jersey in 1971 and enrolled at the University of North Carolina.  On the Tar Heel soccer team, he played midfielder his freshman year and goalie the final three years.  Berson graduated in 1975 with a degree in journalism and later earned a master's of education degree in sport administration in 1977 from Ohio University.

Coaching career
Berson took a position as an assistant coach on The Citadel's men's soccer program in 1976.  A year later, he became the head coach and guided the Bulldogs to their best record ever with an 11–5 mark.  In 1978, Berson accepted the head coaching position at the University of South Carolina.  He led the Gamecocks to a 13–3–1 record in the program's first season and in the second season they obtained a spot in the NCAA Men's Soccer Championship.  The program achieved a high level success under his guidance and his teams won three conference championships in only seven years of being in a conference.  The program has made a total of 22 appearances in the NCAA Men's Soccer Championship, all under his direction. Berson coached three players who appeared in the World Cup (Clint Mathis, Josh Wolff and Brad Guzan) for Team USA, spanning a total of 21 years.

When he retired after the 2021 season, he had the most wins of any active coach in NCAA Division I with 522 career victories.

Personal life
Berson is married and has two children, Erin and Luke, who both went to the University of South Carolina.

Head coaching record

References

External links
USC Biography at GamecocksOnline.com

Living people
1953 births
North Carolina Tar Heels men's soccer players
Ohio University alumni
Soccer players from New Jersey
Sportspeople from Summit, New Jersey
Summit High School (New Jersey) alumni
South Carolina Gamecocks men's soccer coaches
The Citadel Bulldogs men's soccer coaches
Association footballers not categorized by position
American soccer coaches
Association football players not categorized by nationality